Charles Thomas Butler (born June 11, 1932) is a former American bobsledder who competed in the 1950s. He won a bronze medal in the four-man event at the 1956 Winter Olympics in Cortina d'Ampezzo, a gold in the 1959 World Championships, and three other medals at the World Championships.

Butler is a 1955 graduate of Brown University.

References
Bobsleigh four-man Olympic medalists for 1924, 1932-56, and since 1964
All medal winners at World Bobsleigh Championships
Brown University article on Olympians featuring Butler

1932 births
American male bobsledders
Bobsledders at the 1956 Winter Olympics
Olympic bronze medalists for the United States in bobsleigh
Brown University alumni
Living people
Medalists at the 1956 Winter Olympics